Jam-e-Jamshed is a weekly Mumbai newspaper published partly in Gujarati and mainly in English. The Jam-e-Jamshed is the second oldest newspaper in Asia.  The paper was originally published as a weekly from 12 March 1832. In 1853, it was converted into a daily but facing financial pressures in the 1960s it yet again became a weekly.

The paper primarily covers issues of interest to the Zoroastrian community in India. Circulation is not just restricted to the Indian Parsi and Irani, the publication is also popular Zoroastrian diaspora and Gujarati Bohra community. Articles are posted here. Cyrus Contractor's and Meher contractor's articles are seen here

References

External links
 Jam-e-Jamshed newspaper website

Zoroastrian media
1832 establishments in India
Asian news websites
English-language newspapers published in India
Newspapers published in Mumbai
National newspapers published in India
Weekly newspapers published in India
Publications established in 1832